The Ancient Highway is a 1925 American silent adventure film directed by Irvin Willat and written by James Shelley Hamilton and Eve Unsell based upon the novel of the same name by James Oliver Curwood. The film stars Jack Holt, Billie Dove, Montagu Love, Stanley Taylor, Lloyd Whitlock, and William A. Carroll. The film was released on November 8, 1925, by Paramount Pictures.

Plot
As described in a film magazine reviews, Cliff Brant wanders the world but eventually returns to Canada to avenge the death of his father, which was caused by Ivan Hurd. He beats Hurd almost to death. The fight is witnessed by Antoinette St. Ives, owner of a paper company that is a competitor of Hurd’s. Hurd loves Antoinette also, and tries to ruin her company to force her to accept him. Antoinette warns Brant that Hurd has reported him to the police and he  takes to “The  Ancient  Highway,” a famous stream in Quebec. He rescues Antoinette’s brother from a crowd of ruffians and takes him home. The lad introduces Brant to Antoinette and he falls in love with her. He declares his love but she is repulsed by his primitive tactics though she loves him. Hurd plots the ruin of Antoinette’s company once more and tries to jam the logs going to her mill. Brant prevents this and  establishes himself solidly with the young woman. A frenzied monk kills Hurd.

Cast

Preservation
The Ancient Highway is presumed to be a lost film.

References

External links

 
 

1925 films
American adventure films
1925 adventure films
Paramount Pictures films
Films directed by Irvin Willat
American black-and-white films
American silent feature films
Lost American films
Northern (genre) films
Lost adventure films
1925 lost films
Films based on novels by James Oliver Curwood
1920s English-language films
1920s American films
Silent adventure films